Toto is the debut studio album by the American band Toto. It was released in 1978 and includes the hit singles "Hold the Line", "I'll Supply the Love" and "Georgy Porgy", all three of which made it into the Top 50 in the USA. "Hold the Line" spent six weeks in the Top 10, and reached Number 14 in the UK as well. Although not initially very well received by critics, the band quickly gained a following, and the album gained a reputation for its characteristic sound, mixing soft pop with both synth- and hard-rock elements. The band would venture deeper into hard rock territory on their next album.

Reception

Rolling Stone found Toto's attempt to transition from career session players to a band in their own right a failure, calling David Paich's songs "excuses for back-to-back instrumental solos" and saying that none of the four lead vocalists are better than passable.

In a retrospective review, AllMusic argued that the album received a strongly negative critical reaction only because critics felt threatened by Toto's demonstrated ability to create outstanding songs in any genre, which was a contradiction to popular critical assumptions about genre delineations and inspiration's supremacy over craft. They commented on the irony of the critics' reaction, in that it was this ability that made the album so well-liked by listeners of the time.

Classic Rock History critic Brian Kachejian rated four songs from the album −  "Hold the Line", "Girl Goodbye", "I'll Supply the Love" and "Georgy Porgy" among Toto's 7 greatest songs.

Cover art
Philip Garris, well known for painting many Grateful Dead album covers, created the album's emblem after listening to a lyric from the song "Manuela Run" ("You better watch that sword that's hanging over you") which referred to the Sword of Damocles. The sword also represented the band's powerful, hard-edge sound, and, due to their ability to play many types of music, Garris made the sword double-edged to show their versatility. The iron ring represented a piece of work being constructed (the record itself), and the ribbons represented the Year of the Child.

Track listing

Singles
"Hold the Line" / "Takin' It Back"
"I'll Supply the Love" / "You Are the Flower"
"Georgy Porgy" / "Child's Anthem"
"Rockmaker" / "Child's Anthem" (released in the Netherlands)

Personnel

Toto
Bobby Kimball: lead & backing vocals
Steve Lukather: guitars, backing vocals & lead vocals
David Paich: keyboards,  synthesizers, piano, backing & lead vocals
Steve Porcaro: keyboards, synthesizers, lead vocals on "Takin' It Back"
David Hungate: bass guitar
Jeff Porcaro: drums, percussion

Additional musicians
Lenny Castro: percussion
Jim Horn: saxophone, wind instruments
Chuck Findley: horns
Roger Linn: synthesizers
Marty Paich: string arrangements
Sid Sharp: string arrangements
Cheryl Lynn: backing vocals on "Georgy Porgy"

Production
Arranged and Produced by Toto
Engineered and Mixed by Tom Knox
Assistant Engineers: Dana Latham and Gabe Veltri
Recorded at Sunset Sound (Los Angeles, CA), Studio 55 (Los Angeles, CA) and Davlen Sound Studios (North Hollywood, CA).
Mastered by Ron Hitchcock and Mike Reese at The Mastering Lab (Los Angeles, CA).
Cover Art: Philip Garris
Design and Photography by Ed Careaff Studio.
Management: The Fitzgerald Hartley Co.

Charts

Weekly charts

Year-end charts

Certifications

References

External links
"Toto" at discogs

1978 debut albums
Toto (band) albums
Neo-progressive rock albums
Columbia Records albums
Hard rock albums by American artists
Rhythm and blues albums by American artists
Albums recorded at Sunset Sound Recorders